Tarao Naga may refer to:

 Tarao Naga people
 Tarao Naga language